The Universities at Medway is a tri-partite collaboration of the University of Greenwich, the University of Kent and Canterbury Christ Church University on a single campus in Chatham, Medway in South East England.

Site

The historic HMS Pembroke barracks buildings, which form a part of the World Heritage Site application for Chatham Dockyard and its Defences, are the heart of the campus.

In 2007, the Pilkington Building (former Canteen Building, now Refectory, lecture theatre and other offices) and the Drill Hall Library were both joint winners of the Building Renovation category of the Kent Design Awards.

The Medway Building at the University of Kent as part of the Universities at Medway campus, was nominated for Best Public Building at the 2010 Kent Design Awards.

Departments
The following subjects are taught on campus:
 University of Greenwich School of Science;
 University of Greenwich School of Engineering;
 University of Greenwich School of Health and Social Care;
 University of Greenwich School of Business and Computing
 Natural Resources Institute;
 Medway School of Pharmacy;
 University of Kent School of Sport and Exercise Sciences;
 Kent Business School (Historic Dockyard site)
 Kent School of Computing
 University of Kent School of Social Policy, Sociology and Social Research (SSPSSR);
 University of Kent Centre for Journalism;
 University of Kent Centre of Music and Audio Technology (Historic Dockyard site)

Library
The universities share use of the Grade II listed Drill Hall Library.

References

External links
Universities at Medway home page

University of Greenwich
University of Kent
Canterbury Christ Church University
Education in Medway